Bhai Log is a Pakistani Urdu film directed by Syed Faisal Bukhari, produced by Chaudhry Ijaz Kamran, with dialogues and screenplay By M. Pervaiz Kaleem. The cast includes Moammar Rana, Shamoon Abbasi, Saima Noor, Nadeem Baig, Javed Sheikh, Noor, Babrik Shah, Meera, Nayyar Ejaz, Babar Ali, and Shafqat Cheema in lead roles. The music is composed by M. Arshad. The film was released on Eid-ul-Fitr 2011. It was a moderate box office hit.

This film was shot in Pakistan, and locations include Karachi, Lahore, Quetta and Kallar Kahar.

Cast

Release

Box office 
The film turned out to be a local hit at most single-screen cinemas, earning over Rs. 9.7 million in the first three days of its release.

See also 

 Lists of Pakistani films
 Pakistani films of 2011
 Cinema of Pakistan

References

External links 
 , Retrieved 24 August 2016
 https://www.youtube.com/watch?v=8D1BGpvy6AE, film Bhai Log (2011) on YouTube, Retrieved 24 August 2016

2011 films
Pakistani action drama films
Films scored by M Arshad
Films scored by Wajid Nashad
2011 action drama films
2010s Urdu-language films